Christ's College Boat Club is the rowing club for members of Christ's College, Cambridge. It inhabits the oldest wooden framed boathouse on the river, the nearest to Jesus Lock.

Christ's has taken women's headship once during the 2015 Lent Bumps.

History
The men's 1st VIII, having started the Lent Bumps near the bottom of the table, quickly moved up. They had reached the 1st division by 1897, where they remained until 1972. Since the 1980s, the 1st VIII has remained largely in the middle or lower half of the 1st division. In the May Bumps, Christ's started in the 1st division, but dropped away into the 2nd by the mid-1890s. It had recovered a few years later, and largely remained in the 1st division until 1974. Since then, the 1st VIII has spent most of its time in the lower half of the 1st division, occasionally rising into the top-10.

Christ's men are yet to take a headship in the Lent or May Bumps (but were head of the river for the previous combined bumps events in 1833), although the 1st VIII have been as high as 4th in the May Bumps and 2nd in the Lent Bumps.

The women's boat first raced in 1980, and has largely remained in the top-half of the 2nd division or bottom-half of the 1st division, but has risen  to Head of the River in the Lent Bumps and as high as 3rd in the May Bumps. Christ's 1st women became Head of the River on the 3rd day of Lent bumps in 2015 and rowed over on the last day. To celebrate a boat, acquired from LMBC, was burnt on the Third Court. Between 2007 and 2010, the Christ's 1st women bumped 26 times in 32 races without themselves being bumped, including bumping on 17 consecutive days of racing.

Honours

Henley Royal Regatta

See also
 Cambridge University Combined Boat Club
 Christ's College, Cambridge

References

External links
 Cambridge University Combined Boat Club
 Christ's College Boat Club

Rowing clubs of the University of Cambridge
Boat
Sports clubs established in 1830
1830 establishments in England
Rowing clubs in Cambridgeshire
Rowing clubs in England
Rowing clubs of the River Cam